The Chalkaspides ( "Bronze Shields") made up one of the two probable corps of the Antigonid-era Macedonian phalanx in the Hellenistic period, with the Leukaspides ("White Shields") forming the other.

Chalkaspides were found in other armies, too. The majority of the Seleucid phalanx was probably formed by the two corps that are mentioned in the Daphne Parade of 166 BC, namely the 10,000 Chrysaspides (Greek: Χρυσάσπιδες "Golden Shields") and the 5,000 Chalkaspides. Little else is known specifically about them, although they may have been present at the battle of Beth Zachariah in 162. Antigonus Doson armed the citizens of Megalopolis as Bronze Shields for the Sellasia campaign in 222 BC. These units are mentioned by classical writers when describing the Antigonid army in battle, although these units most probably ceased to exist after the Battle of Pydna in 168 BC, when the Antigonid kingdom was crushed by Rome. These names were not only limited to the Antigonid (or Achaean) phalanx though. Plutarch tells of Mithridates VI of Pontus fielding a corps of Chalkaspides against Sulla at the Battle of Chaeronea.

See also
 Argyraspides

Further reading
Plutarch. Aemilius Paullus, c. 20, Sulla, c. 16 & c. 19
Sekunda, Nick (2001), "Hellenistic Infantry Reform in the 160's BC"

References

 Ancient Greek military terminology
 Military units and formations of the Hellenistic world
 Infantry units and formations of Macedon
Ancient Greek infantry types